A tai-pan is a foreign-born senior business executive or entrepreneur operating in China or Hong Kong.

A taipan is an Australian venomous snake.

Taipan or Tai-Pan may also refer to:

Arts, entertainment, and media
Steel Taipan, a steel roller coaster at Dreamworld
Tai-Pan (novel), a 1966 novel by James Clavell
Tai-Pan (film), a 1986 film based on Clavell's novel
"Taipan", a song from the album Circus Animals (1982) by the Australian band Cold Chisel
Taipan, the new name for the Thrillseeker (roller coaster)
Taipan!, a computer game for the Apple II and TRS-80
"The Taipan", a 1922 short story by W. Somerset Maugham

Ships
HMAS Taipan, a Second World War Royal Australian Navy auxiliary vessel
MV Taipan, a container ship freed in the action of 5 April 2010 from Somali pirates
Taipan 28, a sailing yacht or sloop
Taipan Catamarans, high performance sailing catamarans made in Australia

Other uses

 Albert Cheng, a radio commentator-turned-politician in Hong Kong  also known as Tai-pan
Cairns Taipans, an Australasian National Basketball League team
MRH-90 Taipan, Australian Defence Force name for the NH90 helicopter
Taipan, alternative name for the mythical Australian Aboriginal creator-being, the Rainbow Serpent
 Taipan Business Centre, a commercial hub of UEP Subang Jaya, Malaysia
TAIPAN galaxy survey (originally "Transforming Astronomical Imaging surveys through Polychromatic Analysis of Nebulae"), a large-scale spectroscopic survey underway at the UK Schmidt Telescope

zh:大班